Blink Bonnie, also known as Robertson House, is a historic plantation house located near Ridgeway, Fairfield County, South Carolina.  It was built in 1822, and is a 1-½ story clapboard frame house on a brick foundation.   It features a one-story, hipped roof front porch  supported by six double capped square columns. The house has a one-story addition and an old two-room brick kitchen with large open fireplaces, ovens and warmers.

It was added to the National Register of Historic Places in 1972.

References

Plantation houses in South Carolina
Houses on the National Register of Historic Places in South Carolina
Houses completed in 1822
Houses in Fairfield County, South Carolina
National Register of Historic Places in Fairfield County, South Carolina
1822 establishments in South Carolina